Shamsher Bahadur Singh (13 January 1911 – 12 May 1993) was an Indian poet, writer and pillar of the progressive trilogy of modern Hindi poetry. Shamsher, the creator of unique masculine images in Hindi poetry, was associated with the progressive ideology of life. Singh won the Sahitya Akademi in 1977 for Chuka Bhi Hun Nahin Main.

Biography

Shamsher Bahadur Singh was born on 13 January 1911 in village Elam, Muzaffarnagar, Uttar Pradesh. This village is now under Shamli district, after Shamli considered as a separate district in 2011. Due to his father's job, his education was started from Dehradun.  Singh died on 12 May 1993 in Ahmedabad. In 1977, he was awarded the Sahitya Akademi Award for Chuka Bhi Hun Nahin Main.

References

External links

1911 births
1993 deaths
Indian writers
Indian poets
Recipients of the Sahitya Akademi Award in Hindi